PGE Skra Bełchatów 2011–2012 season is the 2011/2012 volleyball season for Polish professional volleyball club PGE Skra Bełchatów. The club won silver medal of Polish Championship, Polish Cup 2012 and silver medal of CEV Champions League.

The club competed in:
 Polish Championship
 Polish Cup
 CEV Champions League

Team roster

Squad changes for the 2011–2012 season

In:

Out:

Most Valuable Players

General classification

Results, schedules and standings

2011–12 PlusLiga

Regular season

Quarterfinal

Semifinal

Final

Polish Cup 2012

Quarterfinal

Semifinal

Final

CEV Champions League 2011-12

Pool F

Final four
PGE Skra achieve silver medal of CEV Champions League. They won the match against Arkas Izmir in semifinal, but losing final against Russian club - VC Zenit-Kazan in the Final Four in Łódź, Poland. The final match ended controversially, because the referee didn't see the block of Russian player and ended the match despite the fact that audience and all players saw the error on screen. PGE Skra players received 3 of 8 individual awards. Best Receiver was Michał Winiarski, the award for Best Spiker received Bartosz Kurek and title of Most Valuable Player gained team captain - Mariusz Wlazły.

References

PGE Skra Bełchatów seasons